Evangelical Press (also known as 'EP Books') is a small Christian not-for-profit publisher of books, including two commentary series and a range of non-fiction aimed at the ordinary reader. Until 2015 it was based in Darlington in the United Kingdom, but is now a virtual company, with a registered company address in Welwyn Garden City. Distribution facilities in Grand Rapids, USA, are provided by JPL Books.  It serves a Reformed conservative evangelical constituency. Sales of books are intended to fund mission activities where overflow permits; books are supplied almost at cost for mission purposes.

EP's best-selling author is John Blanchard; his booklet Ultimate Questions has now printed in excess of eighteen million copies and is translated into over fifty languages, and is also online. EP also publishes the popular Welwyn Commentary series, helpful for preachers but intended to reach ordinary readers as well. In 2018 this series completed a revision and redesign.

History 

EP was founded by a Memorandum and Articles of Association incorporated 12 October 1967.

Activities 

EP has published and distributed several thousand titles from hundreds of authors.  Subjects include Bible commentaries, devotionals, biographies, classics, music, and family books.

EP works co-operatively with Bryntirion Press, producing books on their behalf for wide distribution and occasionally for limited distribution in Wales. It no longer acts as a distributor for other presses (it used to handle, among others, Christian Hymns, ET Perspectives, Grace Publications, Praise Hymns). EP's books are now distributed by Tenofthose in the UK and JPL Fulfillment in the US.

EPMT, now an independent trust, has hosted pastors' conferences in Belarus, Russia, Romania and across Africa.

Most books are in English, but some are available also in French, Spanish, Russian, and other languages.

Evangelical Times 

Evangelical Press co-operated in the publishing of Evangelical Times until 2015.  This is a monthly newspaper which was established in 1967.

Notes

External links 
 Evangelical Press
 Evangelical Times

Christian mass media companies
Evangelical Christian publishing companies
Book publishing companies of the United Kingdom
Publishing companies established in the 1970s
Non-profit publishers